Lullabies is the first EP by Scottish alternative rock band Cocteau Twins. It was released in October 1982, following their debut album, Garlands. The EP contained three non-album tracks, and featured a louder and more driving sound than the album.

Background 

Lullabies was recorded at Palladium Studios in Edinburgh, Scotland and was mixed at Blackwing Studios in London.

Release 

Lullabies was released in October 1982.

The EP was reissued in 1991 as part of The Box Set, and again in 2005 as part of the Lullabies to Violaine compilation. Alternate versions of "Feathers-Oar-Blades" and "Alas Dies Laughing" were included on the Cocteau Twins' BBC Sessions release.

Track listing

Personnel 
 Cocteau Twins

Elizabeth Fraser – vocals
Robin Guthrie – guitar, drum machine
Will Heggie – bass guitar

 Production

 Ivo Watts-Russell – production
 John Fryer – engineering
 John Turner – engineering

References

External links 
 

Cocteau Twins albums
1982 debut EPs